Sir Edward Eric Pochin CBE FRCP (22 September 1909 – 29 January 1990) was a British physician, a specialist in the dangers of ionizing radiation.

He attended St.John's College, Oxford, and qualified in medicine at University College Hospital, London, in 1935.

He married Constance Margaret Julia Tilly  in 1940.  They had two children. His wife died in 1971.

He directed the Medical Research Council's department of clinical research from 1946 to 1974.

Pochin served as advisor to the leading counsel for the British Government and expert witness at the Royal Commission into British nuclear tests in Australia in 1984–1987.

Awards and recognition 
He was appointed a CBE in 1959, and appointed Knight Bachelor in 1975.

He was awarded Gold Medal for Radiation Protection in 1981.

References

1909 births
1990 deaths
Commanders of the Order of the British Empire
Fellows of the Royal College of Physicians
20th-century British medical doctors
Knights Bachelor